The Major Oak is a large English oak (Quercus robur) near the village of Edwinstowe in the midst of Sherwood Forest, Nottinghamshire, England. According to local folklore, it was Robin Hood's shelter where he and his merry men slept. It weighs an estimated 23 tons, has a girth of 33 feet (10 metres), a canopy of 92 feet (28 metres), and is about 800–1,000 years old. In 2014, it was voted 'England's Tree of the Year' by a public poll by the Woodland Trust, receiving 18% of the votes. Its name originates from Major Hayman Rooke's description of it in 1790.

Shape

There are several theories as to how it became so huge and oddly shaped. The Major Oak may be several trees that fused together as saplings, or the tree could have been pollarded. (Pollarding is a system of tree management that enabled foresters to grow more than one crop of timber from a tree, causing the trunk to grow large and thick.) However, there is only limited evidence for this theory as none of the other trees in the surrounding area were pollarded.

History
Support chains were first fitted to the tree in 1908, and its massive limbs have been partially supported by an elaborate system of scaffolding since the 1970s. In 1974, fences were installed around the tree to protect it from root damage, since the number of visitors to the tree was compacting the soil around it.

The formation sign of the 46th Infantry Division of the British Army in the Second World War was the Major Oak. Among the units of the division were battalions of the Sherwood Foresters regiment.

In a 2002 survey, it was voted "Britain's favourite tree".

Also in 2002, a person illegally attempted to sell acorns claimed to be from the Major Oak on an internet-based auction website.

In 2003, in Dorset a plantation was started of 260 saplings grown from acorns of the Major Oak. The purpose was to provide publicity for an internet-based study of the Major Oak, its history, photographic record, variation in size and leafing of the saplings, comparison of their DNA, and an eventual public amenity.

The Major Oak was featured on the 2005 television programme Seven Natural Wonders as one of the wonders of the Midlands.

It was voted 'England's Tree of the Year' in 2014, and came sixth in the European Tree of the Year finals in 2015.

The threat to the Major Oak from fracking is the subject of a song by English musician Beans on Toast on his 2017 album Cushty.

In July 2020 the tree was reported as vandalised, with a three-foot section of bark fallen off.

See also
 List of individual trees
 List of Great British Trees

References

External links

Major Oak and Sherwood Forest fan site
Major Oak history page
2018 Survey of Major Oak tree roots by radar

Individual oak trees
Individual trees in England
Nottinghamshire folklore
Tourist attractions in Nottinghamshire
Sherwood Forest